A national human rights institution (NHRI) is an independent state-based institution with the responsibility to broadly protect and promote human rights in a given country. The growth of such bodies has been encouraged by the Office of the United Nations High Commissioner for Human Rights (OHCHR), which has provided advisory and support services, and facilitated access for NHRIs to the United Nations (UN) treaty bodies and other committees. There are over one hundred such institutions, about two-thirds assessed by peer review as compliant with the United Nations standards set out in the Paris Principles. Compliance with the Principles is the basis for accreditation at the UN, which, uniquely for NHRIs, is not conducted directly by a UN body but by a sub-committee of the Global Alliance of National Human Rights Institutions (GANHRI) called the Sub-Committee on Accreditation. The secretariat to the review process (for initial accreditation, and reaccreditation every five years) is provided by the National Institutions and Regional Mechanisms Section of the OHCHR.

NHRIs can be grouped together into two main categories: human rights commissions and ombudspersons. While most ombudspersons have their powers vested in a single person, human rights commissions are led by multi-member boards, often representative of various societal groups. NHRIs are sometimes set up to deal with specific issues such as discrimination, although the Paris Principles requires they should be bodies with broad responsibilities. Specialised national institutions also exist in many countries to protect the rights of a particular vulnerable group such as ethnic and linguistic minorities, indigenous peoples, children, refugees, persons with disabilities or women.

However, national human rights institutions under the Paris Principles have an explicit and broad human rights mandate that should include both promotion and protection functions. This can include research, documentation and training and education in human rights issues, than the classical ombudsman model which tends to work on handling complaints about administrative deficiencies. While all human rights violations are maladministration, only a small proportion of the workload of an ombudsman deals with violations of human rights standards.

In most countries, a constitution, a human rights act or institution-specific legislation will provide for the establishment of a national human rights institution. The degree of independence of these institutions depends upon national law, and best practice requires a constitutional or statutory basis rather than (for example) a presidential decree.

Nations human rights institutions are also referred to by the Vienna Declaration and Programme of Action and the Convention on the Rights of Persons with Disabilities.

Role 
Special commissions have been established in many countries to ensure that laws and regulations concerning the protection of human rights are effectively applied. Commissions tend to be composed of members from diverse backgrounds, often with a particular interest, expertise or experience in the field of human rights.

Human rights commissions are concerned primarily with the protection of those within the jurisdiction of the state against discrimination or mistreatment, and with the protection of civil liberties and other human rights. Some commissions concern themselves with alleged violations of any rights recognized in the constitution and/or in international human rights instruments.

One of the most important functions vested in many human rights commissions is to receive and investigate complaints from individuals (and occasionally, from groups) alleging human rights abuses committed in violation of existing national law. While there are considerable differences in the procedures followed by various human rights commissions in the investigation and resolution of complaints, many rely on conciliation or arbitration. It is not unusual for a human rights commission to be granted authority to impose a legally binding outcome on parties to a complaint. If no special tribunal has been established, the commission may be able to transfer unresolved complaints to the normal courts for a final determination.

NHRIs are usually able to deal with any human rights issue directly involving a public authority. In relation to non-state entities, some national human rights institutions have at least one of the following functions:
 addressing grievances or disputes involving certain kinds of company (for instance state-owned enterprises, private companies providing public services, or companies that operate at the federal level)
 addressing only certain types of human rights issue (for instance non-discrimination or labour rights)
 addressing complaints or disputes raising any human rights issue and involving any company.
Additionally they may promote and protect the responsibilities of the state and the rights of the individual by:
 providing advice to the state to help determine its international and domestic human rights obligations and commitments
 receiving, investigating and resolving human rights complaints
 providing human rights education and publicity for all sections of society (particularly minority groups such as refugees)
 monitoring the human rights situation in the state and its subsequent actions
 engaging with the human rights international community to advocate for human right recommendations and to raise pressing issues for the state.
Promoting and educating human rights may involve informing the public about the commission's own functions and purposes; provoking discussion about various important questions in the field of human rights; organizing seminars; holding counselling services and meetings; as well as producing and disseminating human rights publications. Another important function of a human rights commission is systematically reviewing a government's human rights policy in order to detect shortcomings in human rights observance and to suggest ways of improving. This often includes human rights proofing of draft legislation, or policies. The degree to which the recommendations or rulings produced by a human rights institution can be enforced varies based on the human rights climate surrounding the institution.

Human rights commissions may also monitor the state's compliance with its own and with international human rights laws and if necessary, recommend changes. The realization of human rights cannot be achieved solely through legislation and administrative arrangements; therefore, commissions are often entrusted with the important responsibility of improving community awareness of human rights.

According to the Paris Principles, the national human rights institutions are obliged to make "preparation of reports on the national situation with regard to human rights in general, and on more specific matters"; and this is mostly done in annual status reports.

Reason for establishing national human rights institutions 
The International Council on Human Rights Policy reported that NHRIs are established in three key ways: in countries that are experiencing conflict (usually internal like South Africa, Ireland or Spain), or to respond to claims of serious human rights abuses. NHRIs can also be established as visual institutional security, as a body that is seen to be dealing with prevalent issues (such as seen in Mexico and Nigeria), or finally to underpin and consolidate other human rights protections (such as in Australia and New Zealand). National governments wanted to establish institutions which reflected their own opinions and cultural identity more effectively. In this regard they enable states to set their own agendas that reflect their individuality. The United Nations Commission on Human Rights passed resolutions in 1992 which recommended promotion of such institutions by government's that did not yet have any, and also promote the development of those that did. At the end of the 20th Century the United Nations Commission would take over tasks that require international involvement. Regional human rights agreements also encouraged this development and establishment of human rights institutions as technical assistance was provided through international arrangements (such as the Asia-Pacific Forum of National Human Rights Institutions).

NHRIs in some member states work at the international and regional level (such as in the European Union). They may work as preventative mechanisms for non-discrimination of minority groups or international crimes (such as torture). The authority and expertise that NHRIs customarily hold provides them the ability to promote equal treatment. Ultimately they are a useful tool in assisting states to comply with international rights standards by providing a uniquely objective perspective and addressing and resolving issues at the domestic level.

Coupled with the United Nations, NHRIs are protecting and providing comprehensive and wide-ranging solutions. However some states are unwilling to give effect to these sanctions, and the United Nations is unable to conduct the widespread and analytical monitoring of countries. In order to be legitimate, effective and credible NHRIs must be independent and effective. One of the most effective tools that NHRIs have is their unique position between the responsibilities of government and the rights of civil society and non-governmental organisations (NGOs). This conceptual space gives NHRIs a positively distinctive role, acting as a different protection service for the people and different tools available to hold the state and other bodies accountable for human rights breaches. However being independent from government and NGOs provides greater difficulty when funding, and working relationships are taken into account. In most countries they receive government funding, and are also created and appointed by a governmental body. This creates somewhat of a parallel obligation and taints the idea of the institutions autonomy and makes it harder to pursue their individual agenda.

Paris Principles 

The Paris Principles were conceived at a 1991 conference convened by the United Nations Commission on Human Rights. Although the priorities and structure of them differ from country to country they have core features. Part A.3 of the Paris Principles adopted in March 1993 by the United Nations Commission on Human Rights provides that NHRIs responsibilities are to ratify human rights treaties and cooperation with human rights mechanisms. The workshop recommendations provide a basis for assessing the effectiveness and independence of a NHRI, identifying six key criteria for states seeking to establish such institutions or to become effective:
 independence from government (allowing them to act as a check or balance)
 independence granted from constitution or legislation (both financially and otherwise)
 appropriate powers of investigation without referral from a higher authority or receipt of an individual complaint
 pluralism, allowing them to coexist with the governing body
 adequate financial and human resources
 clearly defined and broad mandate including the protection and promotion of universal human rights.
Those NHRI that fully comply with these fundamental criteria and have shown independence are accredited an "A status", while those that only partially fulfil them receive a "B status". Those that are given "A status" are allowed to participate in discussion on the United Nations Human Rights Council discussions and more broadly, its mechanisms. The Subcommittee on Accreditation determines the "status" of each NHRI which can be appealed to GANHRI's Chair within 28 days. "C status" NHRIs are labelled as such due to a perception of non-compliance with the Paris Principles, but may still participate in gatherings as observers. The Committee reviews these decisions every five years, giving the institutions multiple opportunities to show further independence or compliance with the Paris Principles. Aiming to be transparent, vigorous and thorough in its evaluations the committee will provide advice on how best to earn "A status" and comply with the Paris Principles.

Global Alliance of National Human Rights Institutions 
The Global Alliance of National Human Rights Institutions (GANHRI), formerly known as the International Coordinating Committee of National Institutions for the Promotion and Protection of Human Rights (ICC), is a representative body of institutions worldwide. Its goal is to develop and create effective and independent NHRIs around the world. These institutions meet the "A status" (voting member) requirements of the Paris Principles and encourages inter-institutional cooperation. In addition to organising international conferences for NHRIs it will also help those institutions in need of assistance and will occasionally help governments to create NHRIs when requested.

International Ombudsman Institute 
NHRIs can deal with a variety of issues including torture, discrimination, environment and employment rights. In addition to human rights commissions they can be constituted or legislated as an ombudsman or a hybrid human-rights ombudsman. The International Ombudsman Institute provides support for the national ombudsman institutions for human rights who similarly protect and promote human rights. They are more concerned with state administration processes and so receive and make complaints in regards to any systematic or administrative human rights breaches or concerns.

International Coordinating Committee of NHRIs 
The international Coordinating Committee of NHRIs was established in 1993 with a Bureau composed of one representative from the Americas, Asia Pacific, Africa and Europe. The Coordinating Committee organises an annual meeting and a biennial conference that facilitates and supports NHRI engagement with the United Nations system. At these gatherings NHRIs are able to share their expertise on specific topics and engage with the United Nations Office of the High Commissioner for Human Rights (OHCHR), which acts as a Secretariat of the Coordinating Committee. In order to facilitate NHRI dialogue with civil society the Coordinating Committee also holds an NGO forum. The Coordinating Committee may also be asked by a government to assist in making a new NHRI or to develop on pre existing ones. Its name was changed to GANHRI in 2016.

Not all of the following NHRIs are accredited through GANHRI.

Regional groupings 
International Ombudsman Institute
Network of African National Human Rights Institutions (NANHRI)
Asia Pacific Forum of National Human Rights Institutions (APF)
European Group of National Human Rights Institutions
Network of National Institutions in the Americas

Sub-national human rights institutions 

Australia
 Anti-Discrimination Board of New South Wales
 Victorian Equal Opportunity and Human Rights Commission
 Equal Opportunity Commission (South Australia)
 Equal Opportunity Commission (Western Australia)
 Anti-Discrimination Commission Queensland
 Office of Anti-Discrimination Commissioner (Tasmania)
 Human Rights Commission (Australian Capital Territory)
 Northern Territory Anti-Discrimination Commission
 Canada
 Alberta Human Rights and Citizenship Commission
 British Columbia Human Rights Tribunal
 Ontario Human Rights Commission
United Kingdom
  The three UK bodies (Great Britain, Northern Ireland, Scotland) are listed above as they are each recognised as NHRIs.
Spain
 Each Spanish region has its own ombudsman.
South Korea
 Provincial and Metropolis level
 Provincial Human Rights Promotion Commission (South Chungcheong Province)
 Provincial Human Rights Promotion Commission (Gangwon Province)
 Seoul Human Rights Commission
 Human Rights Ombudsman (Gwangju)
 Citizen Council for Human Rights Promotion is advisory council for the Ombudsman
 Ulsan Human Rights Commission
 Education
 Human Rights Commission for Students, Gyeonggi Provincial Office of Education
 Human Rights Advocate for Students (Gyeonggi Province)
 Human Rights Commission for Students, Seoul Metropolitan Office of Education
 Human Rights Advocate for Students (Seoul)

See also 

 African Court on Human and Peoples' Rights
 European Court of Human Rights
Greek National Commission for Human Rights
 Human rights
 Human Rights Commissions
 Inter-American Court of Human Rights
 International human rights instruments
 List of human rights articles by country
 List of human rights organisations
 Vienna Declaration and Programme of Action

References

Further reading 

A regularly updated bibliography of NHRI resources (webpages, publications, research) is available on the Asia-Pacific Forum of NHRI's webpage LINK

 EU Fundamental Rights (2020) A gency Strong and effective national human rights institutions – challenges, promising practices and opportunities
 OHCHR (2010) National Human Rights institutions – History, Principles, Roles and Responsibilities (Professional Training Series No.4)
 OHCHR (2009) Survey on National Human Rights Institutions
 Anna-Elina Pohjolainen. (2006).The Evolution of National Human Rights Institutions. The Danish Institute for Human Rights.
 Commonwealth Human Rights Initiative. (2006). Human Rights Commissions: A Citizen’s Handbook, IInd Edition Commonwealth Human Rights Initiative
 International Council on Human Rights Policy. (2005) Assessing the Effectiveness of National Human Rights Institutions International Council on Human Rights Policy/Office of the United Nations High Commissioner for Human Rights
Morten Kjærum. (2003). National Human Rights Institutions – Implementing Human Rights The Danish Institute for Human Rights
 Donnelly, Jack. (2003). Universal Human Rights in Theory & Practice. 2nd ed. Ithaca & London: Cornell University Press.
Birgit Lindsnaes, Lone Lindholt, Kristine Yigen (eds.). (2001) National Human Rights Institutions, Articles and working papers, Input to the discussions of the establishment and development of the functions of national human rights institutions The Danish Institute for Human Rights.

External links 
GANHRI Website
 UNHCHR Universal Declaration of Human Rights 1948
 National Human Rights Institution (NHRI) Profiles (ACCESS Facility)

 
Government institutions